John Kaye or Jonathan Kaye may refer to:

John Kaye (screenwriter) (born 1941), American screenwriter and novelist
John Kaye (politician) (1955–2016), Australian politician
John Kaye (footballer) (born 1940), English former footballer and manager
John Kaye (bishop) (1783–1853), English bishop and academic
John Lister-Kaye (born 1946), English conservationist, author, 8th baronet
Sir John Lister Kaye, 1st Baronet (1772–1827), MCC cricketer
John William Kaye (1814–1876), British military historian
John Brayshaw Kaye (1841–1909), English-born American poet, lawyer and politician
Sir John Lister Kaye, 4th Baronet (1697–1752), British landowner and politician
 Jonathan Kaye (born 1970), American golfer
 Jonathan Kaye, first owner of the restaurant Prezzo
 Jonathan Kaye (linguist) (born 1942), American linguist

See also
John Kay (disambiguation)
John K (disambiguation)